The 1985 Sun Belt Conference men's basketball tournament was held March 1–3 at the Hampton Coliseum in Hampton, Virginia.

Top-seeded VCU defeated rival  in the championship game, 87–82, to win their third Sun Belt men's basketball tournament.

The Rams, in turn, received an automatic bid to the 1985 NCAA tournament. They were joined in the tournament by fellow Sun Belt members UAB and Old Dominion, both of whom received at-large bids.

Format
No changes were made to the tournament format. All eight conference members were placed into the initial quarterfinal round, and each team was seeded based on its regular season conference record.

Bracket

See also
Sun Belt Conference women's basketball tournament

References

Sun Belt Conference men's basketball tournament
Tournament
Sun Belt Conference men's basketball tournament
Sun Belt Conference men's basketball tournament